Kyrylo Demidov (born 18 August 1996) is a Ukrainian football midfielder. He is currently playing for Ukrainian side FC Hirnyk-Sport Komsomolsk.

Career
Demidov is a product of FC Metalurh Zaporizhzhia youth team system.

He made his debut for Metalurh Zaporizhzhia in the Ukrainian Premier League in a match against FC Volyn Lutsk on 29 November 2015.

References

External links
 
 

1996 births
Living people
Ukrainian footballers
FC Metalurh Zaporizhzhia players
Ukrainian Premier League players
FC Hirnyk-Sport Horishni Plavni players
Association football midfielders